Juan Enrique Segarra-Palmer is a Puerto Rican activist. Segarra is one of the founders of the clandestine Puerto Rican pro-independence group Los Macheteros. In 1989, he was convicted of seditious conspiracy, and weapons and conspiracy charges, along with interference with interstate commerce, in connection with the Wells Fargo Depot robbery. He was sentenced to 55 years in prison but in 1999, he accepted President Bill Clinton's clemency offer, becoming eligible for release from prison within five years.

Early years and personal life
Segarra was born in Santurce, Puerto Rico on March 6, 1950. He came from a nationalist family with a long history of resistance to both Spanish and American colonialism. He worked  in poor barrios of New York, in prisons in Boston, and in anti-mining crusades and the land rescue movement in Puerto Rico.

After attending Phillips Academy Andover, he graduated from Harvard University and continued studying in Cuernavaca, Mexico. He is married to fellow former domestic terrorist Lucy Berrios. They have five children: Amilcar, Ramon, Wanda, Luriza, and Zulena.

Seditious conspiracy
In 1985, he was arrested for conspiring to overthrow the U.S. government in Puerto Rico and to obtain money from the Wells Fargo company, insured by the United States government, to continue the independence struggle in Puerto Rico. He had been serving a 60-year sentence in Atlanta, Georgia.

At his trial proceedings, he declared his status as prisoner of war, and refused to participate in the proceedings.

Political activism
The Wells Fargo Depot robbery occurred on 12 September 1983, a day coinciding with the birthdate of Puerto Rican nationalist Dr. Pedro Albizu Campos. The robbery took place in West Hartford, Connecticut and netted over $7 USD million. It was "then the largest cash heist in U.S. history."

The Macheteros's code name for the robbery was "White Eagle" (or Águila Blanca in Spanish). According to the Macheteros part of the money was used to give to the poor communities of Puerto Rico to fund education, food, housing, clothing and even toys for children. According to prosecutors the money was used to finance Los Macheteros.

Charges
The FBI charges against Segarra-Palmer for this robbery include: obstruction of commerce by robbery and conspiracy, bank robbery, aggravated robbery, theft from interstate shipment, foreign and interstate transportation of stolen money, and conspiracy to interfere with commerce by robbery. The group asserted that the money was not used for personal gain, but to further the struggle for Puerto Rico's independence.

The Well Fargo robbery incident resulted in no deaths or injuries.  Segarra-Palmer was given a 55-year federal sentence for seditious conspiracy and other charges.

Among other convicted Puerto Rican nationalists there were sentences of as long as 90 years in federal prisons for offenses including sedition, possession of unregistered firearms, interstate transportation of a stolen vehicle, interference with interstate commerce by violence and interstate transportation of firearms with intent to commit a crime.

None of those granted clemency were convicted in any of the actual bombings. Rather, they had been convicted on a variety of charges ranging from bomb making and conspiracy to armed robbery and firearms violations. They were all convicted for sedition, the act of attempting to overthrow the Government of the United States in Puerto Rico by force.

Sentence
Juan Segarra Palmer, one of the leaders of the group, was sentenced to 55 years in prison. Segarra-Palmer was freed in January 2004.

Political prisoner
At the time of his arrest, Segarra-Palmer and the others declared themselves to be combatants in an anti-colonial war against the United States to liberate Puerto Rico from U.S. domination and invoked prisoner of war status. They argued that the U.S. courts did not have jurisdiction to try them as criminals and petitioned for their cases to be handed over to an international court that would determine their status. The U.S. Government, however, did not recognize their request.

The sentences received by Segarra-Palmer and the other Nationalists were judged to be "out of proportion to the nationalists' offenses." Statistics showed their sentences were almost 20 times greater than sentences for similar offenses by the American population at large.

In 1999, Segarra-Palmer was one of the Macheteros members whose sentences were commuted by President Bill Clinton.

For many years, numerous national and international organizations criticized Segarra-Palmer's incarceration categorizing it as political imprisonment. President Bill Clinton extended him conditional clemency, which he accepted, and was released in 2004. Clinton cited Rev. Desmond Tutu and former President Jimmy Carter as having been influential on his decision to grant Cortes the clemency offer.

Cases involving the release of other Puerto Rican nationalist prisoners have been categorized as cases of political prisoners in some media.

In criticizing President Clinton's decision to release the Puerto Rican prisoners, the conservative U.S. Senate Republican Policy Committee also categorized Cortes as a "Puerto Rican Nationalist", echoing a recent Newsweek article.

In 2006, the United Nations called for the release of the remaining Puerto Rican political prisoners in United States prisons.

See also
Puerto Rican independence movement

References

1950 births
Living people
History of Puerto Rico
Puerto Rican nationalists
Puerto Rican prisoners and detainees
Harvard University alumni
Imprisoned Puerto Rican independence activists
Puerto Rican independence activists
Boricua Popular Army members